Gangsta Musik is the second collaboration album from the duo Lil Boosie and Webbie. The album had well-known hits such as "Swerve" (which would be later used on the film Hustle & Flow) and "Give Me That" (featuring Bun B). The album sold 320,000 overall in the U.S.

Track listing

Charts

References

Webbie albums
Lil Boosie albums
2004 albums
Albums produced by Happy Perez
Gangsta rap albums by American artists
Collaborative albums